Jorge Esteban Sharp Fajardo (born 25 March 1985) is a Chilean lawyer and politician. He is the current Mayor of Valparaíso.

Early life
Born in Punta Arenas, Magallanes Region, he is the son of Leonor Fajardo Filipic and Jorge Sharp Galetovic. His father in 2013 was decorated as a "illustrious citizen" of the Region.

He began as a student leader in Magallanes, being part of FESES' regional re-founding (1999–2000), and his school (Liceo Salesiano San José) student center's president.

Political career

University politics
In 2003, he moved to Valparaíso to study law at the Pontifical Catholic University of Valparaíso (PUCV). He was a member of the Center for Academic Legal Studies between 2005 and 2006. In 2015 he graduated as a lawyer.

During his university period, Sharp was an active participant in the 2006 student protests in Chile and became a founding member of Autonomous Left (IA), a left-wing organization led by then fellow law student Gabriel Boric. He ran for president of Student Center of the PUCV Law School in 2006, and the following year for president of the PUCV Student Federation (FEPUCV). Sharp did not win either election. In 2008, he was part of the PUCV Student Cordon. Also in 2008, Sharp came to FEPUCV board as vice president; he took over as president of federation in 2009.

Mayoralty of Valparaíso
In 2016, he presented himself as an Izquierda Autónoma pre-candidate for the "citizen primary" to run for Mayor of Valparaíso in that year's municipal elections of that year, which he won with 1703 votes. The same year, he was one of the leaders who, along with Boric, left Izquierda Autónoma to form Autonomist Movement. In the 23 October election, he was elected Mayor of Valparaíso with 53% of the votes over Jorge Castro, rightist candidate and militant of the Unión Demócrata Independiente (UDI).

In 2021 Chilean municipal elections, he was re-elected after defeating to Carlos Bannen (UDI).

References

External links
 Jorge Sharp Biography by CIDOB

1985 births
Living people
21st-century Chilean lawyers
Pontifical Catholic University of Valparaíso alumni
Izquierda Autónoma politicians
Mayors of Valparaíso
Members of the Autonomist Movement
Social Convergence politicians
Chilean people of British descent
Presidents of the Pontifical Catholic University of Valparaíso Student Federation